Deni Gordon is an American-born Australian actress and performer. Originally from Boston, Massachusetts, Gordon is the daughter of African-American parents and moved to Australia in 1969 to star in the musical Hair with longtime friend and fellow cast member Marcia Hines. She appeared as a singer and dancer in the ABC sketch comedy series The Dingo Principle and had a guest role in the soap opera Sons and Daughters in 1987. She had a regular role in the fourth and fifth season of Heartbreak High, as teacher Ronnie Brooks, and has appeared as a Priestess in both the film The Matrix and the Farscape episode "Jeremiah Crichton" in 1999.

Gordon is the voice behind the "r-r-r-r-rage!" scream heard in the opening titles and breakers of the long-running ABC music video program Rage.

Gordon was interviewed by ABC Radio National in 2017 about her career.

Filmography

References

External links

Year of birth missing (living people)
Living people
Actresses from Boston
Australian television actresses
Australian film actresses
American expatriates in Australia
Australian people of African-American descent
Australian actors of African descent